Alexander Yuryevich Rumyantsev, born July 26, 1945 in Kushka, Turkmen SSR is a Russian scientist, academician, minister, and ambassador.

Career 

Since graduating MEPhI 1969, worked in Kurchatov Institute researching nuclear physics. In 1994 was appointed as the director of the Kurchatov Institute. In 1996 was elected as the corresponding member of the Russian Academy of Sciences, and since 2000 is the academician.

In 2001 was appointed as the Minister of the Atomic Energy of the Russian Federation, in the cabinet of the Prime Minister Mikhail Kasyanov. During his tenure the Megatons to Megawatts agreement was renegotiated in 2002. Following the dismissal of the whole cabinet in February 2004 by the President Putin, the Ministry was reorganized into a Federal Agency on Atomic Energy where Alexander Rumyantsev was appointed as the CEO. He stepped down from this post in November 2005 during the international scandal involving his predecessor as a Minister, Yevgeny Adamov.

In preparation for his next job Alexander Rumyantsev graduated the Higher Diplomatic Courses of the Diplomatic Academy of the Russian MFA in 2006, and was posted as the Russian ambassador to the Republic of Finland. Later he was awarded the diplomatic rank of the Ambassador Extraordinary and Plenipotentiary of the Russian Federation in April 2008.

Awards and decorations 
 1986 - USSR State Prize for the cycle of works on "New methods of research in the field of solid-state physics based on scattering the neutrons in stationary nuclear reactors"
 2001 - Order of Honour
 2005 - Order of Merit for the Fatherland IV class
 2010 - Order of Friendship
 2017 - Grand Cross of the Order of the Lion of Finland

References

External links
Russian Embassy in Finland official site
Russian Academy of Sciences official site in Russian
Kurchatov Institute official site in Russian

1945 births
Living people
People from Mary Region
Russian nuclear physicists
Full Members of the Russian Academy of Sciences
Recipients of the USSR State Prize
Ambassador Extraordinary and Plenipotentiary (Russian Federation)
Ambassadors of Russia to Finland
Recipients of the Order of Honour (Russia)